Farhan Jassim Mohammed (born 1957) is a retired freestyle wrestler from Iraq. He represented his country at the 1988 Summer Olympics.

References

External links
 Sports-Reference profile
 UWW Database Profiles 1, 2, 3, 4

Living people
1957 births
Iraqi male sport wrestlers
Olympic wrestlers of Iraq
Wrestlers at the 1988 Summer Olympics
Asian Games medalists in wrestling
Wrestlers at the 1978 Asian Games
Wrestlers at the 1982 Asian Games
Wrestlers at the 1986 Asian Games
Asian Games silver medalists for Iraq
Medalists at the 1982 Asian Games
Medalists at the 1986 Asian Games